Leo Stanton Rowe (September 17, 1871 – December 5, 1946) was the director general of the Pan-American Union from 1920 to 1946.

Life
He was born on September 17, 1871 in McGregor, Iowa to Louis Rowe and Catherine Raff. His family moved to Philadelphia and he attended high school and graduated in 1887. He attended the University of Pennsylvania and graduated with a Bachelor of Philosophy degree in 1890. He received his Ph.D. from the University of Halle in 1893. He received his J.D. from the University of Pennsylvania Law School in 1895.

He taught political science at the University of Pennsylvania from 1896 to 1917.

He was United States Assistant Secretary of the Treasury from 1917 to 1919.  He was the director general of the Pan-American Union from 1920 to 1946. He died on December 5, 1946 in Washington, DC.

A now-digitized transcript at the University of Pennsylvania shows that the suffragist, feminist, and women's rights activist, Alice Paul, was one of his students, in the class he offered on Municipal Government and Institutions in the United States and Latin America.

Works
;
Problems of City Government (1908);
The Federal Systems of the Argentine Republic (1921).

References

United States Assistant Secretaries of the Treasury
People from McGregor, Iowa
1871 births
1946 deaths
Central High School (Philadelphia) alumni
University of Pennsylvania faculty
University of Pennsylvania Law School alumni
University of Halle alumni